William Carse (29 August 1800 – 13 May 1845) was a Scottish painter.

Life

Carse was born in Edinburgh in 1800 to (probably) the painter Alexander Carse and his wife. His early paintings are said to be in the style of Paulus Potter.

Carse died in Edinburgh of "inflammation" in 1845. One source believes that the Australian painter James Howe Carse is probably his son but another believes they were brothers.

Legacy
Carse has several paintings in public ownership including Leeds.

References

1800 births
1845 deaths
Artists from Edinburgh
19th-century Scottish painters
Scottish male painters
19th-century Scottish male artists